Anacampsis temerella is a moth of the family Gelechiidae. It is found in most of Europe, except Belgium, Switzerland, the Iberian Peninsula and the Balkan Peninsula.

The wingspan is 11–14 mm.
The forewings are blackish, slightly violet-tinged; stigmata deep black, very indistinct, first discal beyond plical; a broad suffused black fascia at 2/3. Hindwings 1 rather dark grey. The larva is  whitish; dots black; head and plate of 2 black.

Adults are on wing in July and August.

The larvae feed on Salix species, including Salix phylicifolia, Salix caprea, Salix lapponum and Salix repens. They feed in a spinning in the terminal shoots of their host plant.

References

Moths described in 1846
Anacampsis
Moths of Europe